The 1981 Washington Star International was a men's tennis tournament and was played on outdoor clay courts. The event was part of the 1981 Grand Prix circuit. It was the 13th edition of the tournament and was held at Rock Creek Park in Washington, D.C. from July 20 through July 26, 1981. Third-seeded José Luis Clerc won the singles title.

Finals

Singles
 José Luis Clerc defeated  Guillermo Vilas 7–5, 6–2
 It was Clerc's 4th singles title of the year and the 14th of his career.

Doubles
 Raúl Ramírez /  Van Winitsky defeated  Pavel Složil /  Ferdi Taygan 5–7, 7–6(9–7), 7–6(8–6)

References

External links
 ATP tournament profile
 ITF tournament edition details

Washington Open (tennis)
Washington Star International
Washington Star International
Washington Star International